Audea bipunctata is a species of moth in the family Erebidae. It is found in central and southern Africa (Democratic Republic of Congo (Katanga), Kenya, Malawi, Mozambique, Sierra Leone, South Africa (KwaZulu-Natal), Sudan, Tanzania and Zimbabwe.

References

Moths described in 1858
Audea
Moths of Africa